The flag of the United States Space Force is the flag used to represent the United States Space Force, as well as its subsidiary units and formations. It was officially unveiled on 15 May 2020.

Design
The Space Force flag is a black field, with the official flag fringed in platinum. The flag is derived from the central and supporting elements of the Space Force seal, including the delta wing, globe, elliptical orbit, Polaris star, and star clusters. Beneath the central imagery "UNITED STATES SPACE FORCE" and "MMXIX" in white lettering, indicating the name and birth year of the service.

History
The flag was unveiled on 15 May 2020 in an Oval Office ceremony by the Chief of Space Operations General John W. Raymond and the Chief Master Sergeant of the Space Force Roger A. Towberman.

Streamers
Verified combat credit entitles an organization to the appropriate campaign streamers representing the named campaign in which it participated. The campaign streamer will be embroidered with the name and years of the campaign. Non-combat service is represented by an organizational service streamer, which is not embroidered.

Armed Forces Expeditionary

Southwest Asia Service

Kosovo Campaign

Afghanistan Campaign

Global War on Terrorism Service

Global War on Terrorism Expeditionary

Iraq Campaign

Inherent Resolve Campaign

Other flags
Other flags include the flags of the chief of space operations, vice chief of space operations, chief master sergeant of the Space Force, and Space Force general officers.

Positional flags

General officer flags

Organizational flags

See also
 Flags of the United States Armed Forces
Ranks and insignia of space forces

References

Space Force
United States Space Force
United States Space Force